Farbauti  or Saturn XL is a natural satellite of Saturn. Its discovery was announced by Scott S. Sheppard, David C. Jewitt, Jan Kleyna, and Brian G. Marsden on May 4, 2005, from observations taken between December 12, 2004, and March 9, 2005.

Farbauti is about 5 kilometres in diameter, and orbits Saturn at an average distance of 20,291 Mm in 1079.099 days, at an inclination of 158° to the ecliptic (131° to Saturn's equator), in a retrograde direction and with an eccentricity of 0.209.

It was named in April 2007 after Fárbauti, a storm giant from Norse mythology, father of Loki.

References

 Institute for Astronomy Saturn Satellite Data
 Jewitt's New Satellites of Saturn page
 IAUC 8523: New Satellites of Saturn May 4, 2005 (discovery)
 MPEC 2005-J13: Twelve New Satellites of  Saturn May 3, 2005 (discovery and ephemeris)
 IAUC 8826: Satellites of Jupiter and Saturn April 5, 2007 (naming the moon)

Norse group
Moons of Saturn
Irregular satellites
Discoveries by Scott S. Sheppard
Astronomical objects discovered in 2005
Moons with a retrograde orbit